Remo Airoldi (born 4 February 1921) was an Italian bobsledder who competed in the late 1940s. He finished 11th in the four-man event at the 1948 Winter Olympics in St. Moritz.

Airoldi was born in Izmir, Turkey. He was the brother of fellow Olympian Enrico Airoldi.

References

External links

1921 births
Olympic bobsledders of Italy
Bobsledders at the 1948 Winter Olympics
Italian male bobsledders
Possibly living people